Royal Malaysia Police Football Club, well known as PDRM FC, is a Malaysian professional football club associated with the entity of the Royal Malaysia Police, that participates in the Malaysia Super League. The club is based in Kuala Lumpur.

Domestically, the club has won the Malaysia Premier League, the second tier of Malaysian football in 2006–07 and 2014. They also won the People of Maldives Invitational Cup in 2015.

History
During 2006–07 season, PDRM won the league title and were promoted to Malaysia Super League in 2007–08. The club managed to keep up in the league as they finished their debut in the Malaysia's top flight at the seventh position. 2009 was unfortunate for the club, the team failed to keep their in the Malaysia Super League as they ended the league at the last spot and was relegated to Malaysia Premier League.

In 2014, the club named Malaysian football legend, Dollah Salleh as their head coach and brought quality foreign and local players to strengthen the squad and made their target to win the Malaysia Premier League once again that year. With much hard work and dedication, PDRM managed to finish at the top of the table and promoted to the Malaysia Super League as the champions of 2014 Malaysia Premier League. Though, Dollah Salleh left the club as Football Association of Malaysia decided to appoint him as the head coach of Malaysia national team and Azman Adnan, who had been the assistant for him during the time took his place. Ali Ashfaq from Maldives, who played a vital on PDRM's road to Super league won the Best Foreign Player Award in Malaysia national football awards in 2014.

The club camped at Hong Kong in late December 2014 and also participated and won the 2015 People of Maldives Invitational Cup held in Maldives in January 2015.

In 2015 Malaysia Super League, the club edged the defending champions of Malaysia Super League, Johor Darul Ta'zim and Kelantan in their first games of the league. However, with several problems came up from the squad, they finished the league at the 6th position in the first year after promotion in 2014. The Malian striker, Dramane Traore had been the main man scoring the goals for the club in 2015 season. Yet, Ali Ashfaq was nominated among the best three players for the Best Foreign Player Award in 2015.

On 15 January 2016, PDRM camped at Bangkok, Thailand with the new foreign signings, former Johor Darul Ta'zim, Andrezinho and Singaporean international, Safuwan Baharudin.

Stadium

Kit manufacturer and shirt sponsor

Players

First-team squad

Development squad

Under-21s

Under-19s

Club officials

Senior officials

Coaching staff

Former coaches

Club record

Note 

P = Played, W = Win, D = Draw, L= Loss, F = Goal For, A = Goal Against, Pts = Points, Pos = Position

Source:

Individual player awards

M-League Golden boot winners

M-League Top goalscorers

Records and statistics

Goalscorers

By competition
Most goals scored in all competitions: 47 –  Khairul Izuan Abdullah, 2009–present
Most goals scored in Malaysia Super League: 20 –  Dramane Traoré, 2015
Most goals scored in Malaysia Cup: 9 –  Ali Ashfaq, 2014–present
Most goals scored in FA Cup: 3
 Dramane Traoré, 2015
 Charles Chad, 2014

In a single season
Most goals scored in a season in all competitions: 29 –  Dramane Traoré, 2015
Most goals scored in a single Malaysia Super League season: 20 –  Dramane Traoré, 2015
Most goals scored in a single Malaysia Cup season: 6 –  Ali Ashfaq, 2014
Most goals scored in a single FA Cup season: 3
 Dramane Traoré, 2015
 Charles Chad, 2014

Honours

League
 Malaysia Premier League
 Winners (2): 2007, 2014 Malaysia FAM League Runners-up:  2000

Other
 People's Cup Winners (1):''' 2015

Foreign players

Affiliated clubs
  Armed Forces F.C.

References

External links
 Official Website
 PDRM FC at Soccerway.com

 
Malaysia Premier League clubs
Football clubs in Malaysia
Football associations in Malaysia
Police association football clubs in Malaysia